The Oxfordshire Senior Cup is the senior county cup of the Oxfordshire Football Association. The competition was first contested in the 1884–85 season.

Winners (up to 2021/22 season inclusive)

Oxford City 36 (inc. one shared)
Headington United/Oxford United 14
Witney Town 12 (inc. one shared)
Thame United 8
Cowley 6
Banbury United 6
Culham College 5
Henley 5
Oxford United College Servants 5
Pressed Steel 4
Morris Motors 3
Banbury Britannia Works (& Volunteers United) 2
Banbury Harriers 2
Bicester Town 2
Caversham Rovers 2

Chipping Norton Town 2
Pegasus 2
Peppard 2
RAF Heyford 2
North Leigh 3
Amersham Hall School 1
Ardley United 1
Banbury Stones Athletic 1
Cygnets 1
I.T.C. (Infantry Training Centre) 1
Quarry Nomads 1
RAF Bicester 1
RAF Harwell 1
St. Frideswide's 1

Finals since 1990

Previous winners

1885 Culham College F.C.

1886 Culham College F.C.

1887 Oxford United College Servants F.C.

1888 Banbury Harriers F.C.

1889 Oxford United College Servants F.C.

1890 Amersham Hall School F.C.

1891 Banbury Harriers F.C.

1892 Oxford United College Servants F.C.

1893 Oxford United College Servants F.C.

1894 Oxford United College Servants F.C.

1895 Witney F.C.

1896 Oxford Cygnets F.C.

1897 Culham College F.C.

1898 Witney F.C.

1899 Witney F.C.

1900 Oxford City F.C.

1901 Oxford City F.C.

1902 Culham College F.C.

1903 Culham College F.C.

1904 Henley F.C.

1905 Banbury Britannia Works & Volunteers United F.C.

1906 Thame F.C.

1907 Caversham Rovers F.C.

1908 Caversham Rovers F.C.

1909 Thame F.C.

1910 Thame F.C.

1911 Henley F.C.

1912 Oxford City F.C.

1913 Henley F.C.

1914 Henley F.C.

1915–1919 Competition suspended – World War I

1920 Banbury Britannia Works F.C.

1921 Morris Motors F.C.

1922 Cowley F.C.

1923 Cowley F.C.

1924 Cowley F.C.

1925 Cowley F.C.

1926 St. Frideswide F.C.

1927 Cowley F.C.

1928 Banbury Stones Athletic F.C.

1929 Oxford City F.C.(Reserves)

1930 Bicester Town F.C.

1931 Oxford City F.C.(Reserves)

1932 R.A.F. Heyford F.C.

1933 R.A.F. Bicester F.C.

1934 R.A.F. Heyford F.C.

1935 Cowley F.C.

1936 Headington United F.C.

1937 Pressed Steel F.C.

1938 Pressed Steel F.C.

1939 Bicester Town F.C.

1940 Pressed Steel F.C.

1941 I.T.C. F.C. (Infantry Training Centre)

1942 Oxford City F.C.

1943 R.A.F. Harwell F.C.

1944 Oxford City F.C.

1945 Oxford City F.C.

1946 Oxford City F.C.

1947 Henley Town F.C.

1948 Headington United F.C.

1949 Oxford City F.C.

1950 Pegasus F.C.

1951 Oxford City F.C.

1952 Headington United F.C.

1953 Witney Town F.C.

1954 Oxford City F.C.

1955 Witney Town F.C.

1956 Witney Town F.C.

1957 Oxford City F.C.

1958 Pegasus F.C.

1959 Witney Town F.C.

1960 Oxford City F.C.

1961 Oxford City F.C.

1962 Oxford City F.C.

1963 Oxford City F.C.

1964 Morris Motors F.C.

1965 Oxford City F.C.

1966 Quarry Nomads F.C.

1967 Oxford City F.C.

1968 Oxford City F.C.

1969 Oxford City F.C.

1970 Oxford City F.C.

1971 Oxford City F.C. and
Witney Town F.C. (Joint holders)

1972 Oxford City F.C.

1973 Witney Town F.C.

1974 Oxford City F.C.

1975 Pressed Steel F.C.

1976 Thame United F.C.

1977 Chipping Norton Town F.C.

1978 Chipping Norton Town F.C.

1979 Banbury United F.C.

1980 Peppard F.C.

1981 Thame United F.C.

1982 Peppard F.C.

1983 Oxford City F.C.

1984 Oxford City F.C.

1985 Morris Motors F.C.

1986 Oxford City F.C.

1987 Oxford United F.C.

1988 Banbury United F.C.

1989 Oxford United F.C.

1990 Oxford United F.C.

1991 Oxford United F.C.

1992 Oxford United F.C.

1993 Thame United F.C.

1994 Witney Town F.C.

1995 Witney Town F.C.

1996 Oxford City F.C.

1997 Oxford City F.C.

1998 Witney Town F.C.

1999 Oxford City F.C.

2000 Oxford City F.C.

2001 Thame United F.C.

2002 Thame United F.C.

2003 Oxford City F.C.

2004 Banbury United F.C.

2005 Banbury United F.C.

2006 Oxford United F.C.

2007 Banbury United F.C.

2008 North Leigh F.C.

2009 Oxford United F.C.

2010 Oxford United F.C.

2011 Oxford United F.C.

2012 North Leigh F.C.

2013 Oxford United F.C.

2014 Ardley United F.C.

2015 Banbury United F.C.

2016 Oxford United F.C. 

2017 North Leigh F.C. 

2018 Oxford City F.C. 

2019 Oxford City F.C.

2022 Oxford City F.C.

References

County Cup competitions
Football in Oxfordshire